The diplomonads (Greek for "two units") are a group of flagellates, most of which are parasitic.  They include Giardia duodenalis, which causes giardiasis in humans.  They are placed among the metamonads, and appear to be particularly close relatives of the retortamonads.

Most diplomonads are double cells: they have two nuclei, each with four associated flagella, arranged symmetrically about the body's main axis.  Like the retortamonads, they lack both mitochondria and Golgi apparatuses.  However, they are now known to possess modified mitochondria, in the case of G. duodenalis, called mitosomes.  These are not used in ATP synthesis the way mitochondria are, but are involved in the maturation of iron-sulfur proteins.

Possible sexual reproduction in Giardia

The common intestinal parasite Giardia duodenalis (synonyms Giardia lamblia, G. intestinalis) was once considered to be a descendant of a protist lineage that predated the emergence of meiosis and sex.  However, researchers found G. duodenalis to have a core set of genes that function in meiosis and that are widely present among sexual eukaryotes.  These results suggested that Giardia duodenalis is capable of meiosis and thus sexual reproduction.  Furthermore, Cooper et al. found direct evidence in Giardia duodenalis for infrequent meiotic recombination, indicative of sexual reproduction between individuals.  Lasek-Nesselquist et al. also detected molecular signatures consistent with meiotic sex. The possibility of sexual reproduction is still debated.

Giardia duodenalis contains two functionally equivalent nuclei that are inherited independently during mitosis.  In the giardial cyst these nuclei fuse (karyogamy) and undergo homologous recombination facilitated by meiosis gene homologs.  The recombination associated with karyogamy may primarily function to repair DNA damage.

Giardia duodenalis is divided into eight assemblages based on host specificities and genetic divergence of marker genes.  Although recombination can occur infrequently within assemblages, Xu et al. found that recombination between individuals from different assemblages is very rare.  They suggested that the assemblages are genetically isolated lineages, and thus could be viewed as separated Giardia species.

References 

Flagellates
Metamonads